Charles L. Lacy (July 4, 1885 – July 5, 1942) was an American businessman and politician.

Born in Sheffield, Indiana, Lacey was a sportsman and resort owner in Mercer, Wisconsin. He organized the Greater Wisconsin Recreation Association and was interested in conservation. In 1929, Lacey served in the Wisconsin State Assembly and was a  Republican. Lacy died in Mercer, Wisconsin.

Notes

1885 births
1942 deaths
People from Tippecanoe County, Indiana
People from Iron County, Wisconsin
Businesspeople from Wisconsin
Republican Party members of the Wisconsin State Assembly
20th-century American politicians
20th-century American businesspeople